Ivan “Ivica” Barbarić (born 23 February 1962) is a Bosnian professional football manager and former player who is the manager of Bosnian Premier League club Široki Brijeg.

As a player, he got capped once for Yugoslavia and participated in the 1988 Summer Olympics in Seoul as a member of the Yugoslav national team. Barbarić played seven years for Velež Mostar with whom he won the 1985–86 Yugoslav Cup. He ended his playing career in Spain.

As a manager, Barbarić won the 2005–06 Bosnian Premier League with Široki Brijeg, who he managed from 2004 to 2006 and also had stints in 2007 and in 2009.

Managerial statistics

Honours

Player
Velež Mostar
Yugoslav Cup: 1985–86

Real Burgos
Segunda División: 1989–90

Manager
Široki Brijeg
Bosnian Premier League: 2005–06

References

External links
Profile at Serbian federation official site
Ivica Barbarić at Soccerway

1962 births
Living people
Sportspeople from Metković
Yugoslav footballers
Yugoslav expatriate footballers
Yugoslav expatriate sportspeople in Spain
Yugoslavia international footballers
Bosnia and Herzegovina footballers
Bosnia and Herzegovina expatriate footballers
Bosnia and Herzegovina expatriate sportspeople in Spain
Expatriate footballers in Spain
Yugoslav First League players
La Liga players
Segunda División players
FK Velež Mostar players
Real Burgos CF footballers
Racing de Santander players
CD Badajoz players
UD Almería players
Olympic footballers of Yugoslavia
Footballers at the 1988 Summer Olympics
Association football defenders
Bosnia and Herzegovina football managers
Premier League of Bosnia and Herzegovina managers
J2 League managers
Expatriate football managers in Japan
NK Široki Brijeg managers
Ehime FC managers
Hokkaido Consadole Sapporo managers
HŠK Zrinjski managers